Meroles knoxii, Knox's ocellated sand lizard or Knox's desert lizard, is a species of sand-dwelling lizard in the family Lacertidae. It occurs in Namibia and South Africa.

References

Meroles
Reptiles of Namibia
Reptiles of South Africa
Reptiles described in 1829
Taxa named by Henri Milne-Edwards